Róbert Varga (also spelled Robert Varga) (born July 30, 1988) is a retired tennis player from Hungary. He played for the Hungarian Davis Cup team in 2009.

Varga has a career-high ATP singles ranking of 561, achieved on 11 May 2009. He also has a career-high ATP doubles ranking of 805, achieved on 18 October 2010.

Future and Challenger finals

Singles: 2 (0–2)

Doubles 5 (3–2)

Davis Cup

Participations: (4–0)

   indicates the outcome of the Davis Cup match followed by the score, date, place of event, the zonal classification and its phase, and the court surface.

References

External links

Living people
1988 births
Hungarian male tennis players
20th-century Hungarian people
21st-century Hungarian people